William Cleveland (born September 27, 1965) is a swimmer who represented the United States Virgin Islands. He competed in five events at the 1988 Summer Olympics.

References

External links
 

1965 births
Living people
United States Virgin Islands male swimmers
Olympic swimmers of the United States Virgin Islands
Swimmers at the 1988 Summer Olympics
Place of birth missing (living people)